Hotel Lafayette, also known as the Lafayette Hotel, is a historic hotel building located at Buffalo in Erie County, New York.

History and features
It is a seven-story steel frame and concrete building designed in the French Renaissance style. It is composed of several rectangular building units completed between 1902 and 1926. It features decorative vitreous red brick and white terra cotta trim.

The original building was designed by the firm of Bethune, Bethune & Fuchs, including architect Louise Blanchard Bethune (1856–1913), and built between 1902 and 1911. Additions from 1916–1917 and 1924–1926 were completed by  Esenwein and Johnson. The lobby was decorated in 1942 in the Art Moderne style. In its prime, the Lafayette Hotel was considered one of the 15 finest hotels in the country. Besides elevators, every room featured hot and cold water and a telephone. A  antenna is attached to the building.

It was listed on the National Register of Historic Places in 2010.

2012 renovation

In 2012, the completion of a $35 million rehabilitation project restored the hotel to its original beauty. The hotel now contains 92 one & two bedroom apartments, 57 hotel rooms, several bars, restaurants and banquet facilities. The renovation was conducted by Buffalo property developer Rocco Termini, along with architect Jonathan Morris and his team at Carmina Wood Morris PC.

References

External links

Official Hotel Lafayette website
Buffalo as an Architectural Museum: Hotel Lafayette
Skyscraperpage building page

Buildings and structures in Buffalo, New York
Hotel buildings completed in 1902
Hotel buildings on the National Register of Historic Places in New York (state)
Renaissance Revival architecture in New York (state)
Art Deco architecture in New York (state)
National Register of Historic Places in Buffalo, New York